The Roosevelt Freeway can refer to one of several roads:

 FDR Drive in New York City
 Roosevelt Freeway (Oregon), a project in Eugene, Oregon, which was cancelled in 1978